Ariel Cañete (born 7 February 1975) is an Argentine professional golfer.

Career
Cañete was born in Santa Teresita, Buenos Aires. He turned professional in 1995.

Having competed on the local Argentine Tour, and the Tour de las Américas earlier in his career, in 2002 Cañete began playing on the Challenge Tour, Europe's second tier development tour. He finished high enough in the end of season rankings in 2005 to gain a place on the main European Tour. He finished the 2006 season in 143rd position on the Order of Merit, which was not enough to secure full playing rights for 2007. Having played in two Challenge Tour events in Latin America, he was given an invite to the European Tour's Joburg Open, and he made the most of the opportunity by claiming the title, and with it a two-year exemption on the tour.

After his European Tour victory, Cañete also played events on the Sunshine Tour, Challenge Tour, and Asian Tour with little success; he had two top ten European Tour finishes from 2008 to 2011. He later found stability in Latin America and earned his first professional win since 2007 at the 2012 TransAmerican Power Products Open of PGA Tour Latinoamérica. Later in the 2012 season he picked up his second victory on PGA Tour Latinoamérica when he won the Olivos Golf Classic-Copa Personal. Cañete won the PGA Tour Latinoamérica Order of Merit in 2012 and earned promotion to the Web.com Tour for 2013; Cañete was fully exempt on the Web.com Tour as a result of winning the Order of Merit. It is his second time on the Web.com Tour; he played in seven events and made one cut (T35 at the Inland Empire Open) during the 1996 season of what was then the Nike Tour.

Cañete has played in one major, the 2008 Open Championship. He finished T39 after earning entry through a qualifying tournament.

Amateur wins (3)
 1992 South American Cup (Los Andes Cup)
 1993 South American Cup (Los Andes Cup)
 1994 South American Cup (Los Andes Cup)

Professional wins (6)

European Tour wins (1)

1Co-sanctioned by the Sunshine Tour

PGA Tour Latinoamérica wins (2)

TPG Tour wins (1)

Other wins (2)
 2002 Norpatagonico Open (Argentina)
 2003 Center Open (Argentina)

Results in major championships

Note: Cañete only played in The Open Championship.
"T" = tied

Team appearances
Amateur
 Eisenhower Trophy (representing Argentina): 1994

See also
 2005 Challenge Tour graduates

References

External links

Argentine male golfers
PGA Tour Latinoamérica golfers
European Tour golfers
Sportspeople from Buenos Aires Province
1975 births
Living people